Rodger McDaniel is an American politician from the state of Wyoming. He is a member of the Democratic Party. McDaniel has served in the Wyoming Senate and Wyoming House of Representatives.

Career
Rodger McDaniel was born in Leadville, Colorado, on August 14, 1948.  He moved with his family to Cheyenne, Wyoming, as a small child.  A lifelong Democrat and champion of Democratic causes, McDaniel served as the Wyoming Administrative Aide to U.S. Representative Teno Roncalio (D-WY) for several years prior to Rep. Roncalio's retirement.  McDaniel was elected to the Wyoming State House of Representatives in 1971 at the age of 21.  He went on to serve in the Wyoming State Senate until 1981.  In 1982, McDaniel ran unsuccessfully against U.S. Senator Malcolm Wallop (R-WY). During his tenure as a state legislator, McDaniel received the "Legislator of the Year" award.  He has also served on the Board of Trustees of Laramie County Community College.
 
McDaniel graduated from the University of Wyoming College of Law with a Juris Doctor Degree and practiced law for twenty years, specializing in employment and insurance law. McDaniel also served as the Wyoming lobbyist for State Farm Insurance and Anheuser Busch Companies for all of his legal career.  He also participated, as a member of the Lawyer's Guild, as a human rights observer in Guatemala.

From 1991–1992, McDaniel and his family joined Habitat for Humanity as International Partners in Guatemala and Nicaragua.  Shortly after his return to Wyoming, McDaniel closed his law practice in order to attend Iliff School of Theology in Denver, Colorado, earning a Masters in Divinity Degree.

Between 1999 and 2002, McDaniel consulted for the Wyoming Department of Health's Substance Abuse Division, where he co-authored, with Dr. Dennis Embry, Reclaiming Wyoming: A Comprehensive Blueprint for Prevention, Early Intervention and Treatment of Substance Abuse. Governor Dave Freudenthal appointed McDaniel Director of the Department of Family Services in 2002. In 2006, Governor Freudenthal appointed him Deputy Director of the Substance Abuse and Mental Health Division of the Department of Health.

In 2013, Rodger McDaniel authored a book on the relationship between Joseph McCarthy and Lester Hunt, entitled Dying for Joe McCarthy's Sins: The Suicide of Wyoming Senator Lester Hunt.

Rodger McDaniel resides in Cheyenne, Wyoming with his wife Patricia.  They have two adult children and five grandchildren.  He is the Pastor of Highlands United Presbyterian Church, as well as a published author and guest columnist for the Wyoming Tribune Eagle.

Bibliography

References

1948 births
Living people
20th-century American politicians
American lobbyists
American non-fiction writers
American Presbyterian ministers
Wyoming lawyers
Democratic Party members of the Wyoming House of Representatives
Democratic Party Wyoming state senators
United States congressional aides
University of Wyoming College of Law alumni
Politicians from Cheyenne, Wyoming
People from Leadville, Colorado